Angel Grace Trazona Guardian (born September 6, 1998) is a Filipino-Israeli actress, recording artist and commercial model. She is best known for her participation in the reality show Running Man Philippines, where she became the first Ultimate Runner.

Filmography

Movies

Television

Discography

Singles

References

External links 

 
 Sparkle GMA Artist Center profile

1998 births
Living people
Filipino female models
Filipino people of Israeli descent
People from Manila
GMA Network personalities
GMA Music artists
Filipino child actresses
Filipino television actresses
Filipino film actresses
Tagalog people
Participants in Philippine reality television series
Reality show winners